Zoran Lukić (born 27 November 1956) is a Swedish football manager and a former player. Born in Bosnia and Herzegovina, at the time part of Yugoslavia, Lukić had a long career in FK Sarajevo. He left for Sweden prior to the Yugoslav Wars (1991–95).

Managerial career
He left title holders Djurgårdens IF in summer 2004.
Appointed by Ljungskile in August 2016, Lukić was not able to save the club from the drop. In December 2019 he was put in charge of Sundbybergs IK.

Personal life
Born in Sarajevo, Yugoslavia, his father was Bosnian Serb and his mother was Bosnian Croat. Bosnian Serb leader Radovan Karadžić persuaded Zoran to leave Yugoslavia, as the Yugoslav Wars were about to start. His daughter is Andrea Lukić, a Swedish fashion model.

Honours 

 Djurgårdens IF
 Superettan: 2000
 Allsvenskan: 2002, 2003
 Svenska Cupen: 2002, 2004

 Qviding FIF
 Division 1: 2007
Individual
 Swedish Manager of the Year: 2002, 2003

References

External links
 Stats from Yugoslav League in Zerodic.
 

1956 births
Living people
Footballers from Sarajevo
Association football midfielders
Yugoslav footballers
FK Sarajevo players
SC Neusiedl 1919 players
Favoritner AC players
FC Admira Wacker Mödling players
FC Prishtina players
Yugoslav First League players
Yugoslav expatriate footballers
Expatriate footballers in Austria
Yugoslav expatriate sportspeople in Austria
Expatriate footballers in Sweden
Yugoslav expatriate sportspeople in Sweden
Bosnia and Herzegovina football managers
Djurgårdens IF Fotboll managers
Örgryte IS managers
Ljungskile SK managers
Allsvenskan managers
Bosnia and Herzegovina expatriate football managers
Expatriate football managers in Sweden
Bosnia and Herzegovina expatriate sportspeople in Sweden